Elmonica/Southwest 170th Avenue is a light rail station on the MAX Blue Line in Beaverton, Oregon, United States. Named after a former station on the Oregon Electric Railway, it is the eleventh stop westbound on the Westside MAX. The side platform stop is located between Hillsboro to the west and Beaverton to the east.

Details
The station has two side platforms.  To the northeast of the station is one of the facilities where MAX trains are stored and serviced, called Elmonica Yard, or "Elmo Yard" for short.  As a result, most trains in the morning start here, and go west to Hillsboro's Hatfield Government Center station before heading to Gresham's Cleveland Avenue station, and service at the end of the day splits between terminating here or Merlo Road/Southwest 158th Avenue, and Hillsboro's Hatfield Government Center station and returning eastward to the yard.

History
Elmonica station is named after the area, which was named after a station on the old Oregon Electric Railway. The MAX line follows the old Oregon Electric right-of-way and shares several stop names with the old interurban. The name derives from the names of the daughters of an owner of land along the route. Samuel B. Stoy, a Portland insurance executive, owned property along the proposed OE line and only gave permission for the railroad to go through his property if the company agreed to name the station after his daughters, Eleanor and Monica. After the station was named Elmonica, this then led to the area around the station becoming known as Elmonica as well.

References

Source

External links
Station information (with eastbound ID number) from TriMet
Station information (with westbound ID number) from TriMet
MAX Light Rail Stations – more general TriMet page
Park & Ride Locations – TriMet page

MAX Light Rail stations
Railway stations in the United States opened in 1998
MAX Blue Line
1998 establishments in Oregon
Transportation in Beaverton, Oregon
Buildings and structures in Beaverton, Oregon
Railway stations in Washington County, Oregon